In the DJ culture, a resident DJ or local DJ refers to a DJ is part of the staff of employees of the club, unlike a guest artist, who works as freelancer, which means that he or she plays on several clubs (including several countries). Obtaining a residence implies being part of the salaried staff of a company. Unlike a guest, the resident almost inevitably has to conform to certain musical styles dictated by the hiring company. Instead, the resident's sponsorship rests with the club itself, which will probably means greater investment in marketing than if it worked independently.

Generally, a resident tends to obtain less fame , considerations (and salary) than a guest, although there are notable exceptions to this; examples of successful residents are Sandrien from Trouw (Amsterdam), or Ben Klock and Marcel Dettmann from Berghain (Berlin).  The residency is considered the best way of pragmatic learning for a novice DJ: everything he/she learned at home is now put into practice with an audience in front of him/her, forcing he/she to engage in a "conversation" with the audience.

History 
In the early ages of clubbing, when the first underground nightclubs were formed in the 70s and 80s fixed hiring was the most common practice of signing DJs, so they were all residents. The culture of electronic music and DJing emerged in the large industrialized cities of the Anglo-Saxon countries: the United Kingdom and the United States. Later, the DJ profession became popular and diversified, and changed the paradigm to a form of freelance employment; "By the early 1990s the network of commercial raves and rave-style clubs of macropists had already created a closed circuit of guest DJs".  who traveled all over the country, and therefore the number of resident DJs was reduced.

At the end of the 90s, due to the need for renovation in the world, the figure of the resident DJ re-emerged, and has remained that way to this day. However, the current role of the resident varies slightly from the traditional role, as a new concept has emerged: the 'guest resident', meaning several 'guest' residents who take turns regularly at a club for a while. One example was Paul Oakenfold who got a temporary contract and moved to Liverpool for a few months in 1997 to play on Saturdays at Cream.

By blurring the line that separates residence from invitation, greater work flexibility is allowed for both DJs and clubs. This is how it has been maintained throughout the 21st century.

Roles of a resident DJ 

 Serve as support for guest DJs, on many occasions adapting to their musical style.
 Warm up the dance floor, as being the "opening act", to prepare the public for the next set.
 Availability for the club, this implies having an irregular, flexible schedule, as some weekends the resident DJ will have to play at the beginning of the night, others at rush hour and others at closing.
 Be responsible for the "musical identity" of the club; Just as the graphic designer will be in charge of the visual communication of the company, the resident DJ(s) are usually responsible for the musical line of the club, and in part, therefore, for the image / message that is projected.
In this sense, the reporter A. Arango writes for Vice:

In a broader sense, local DJs are also somewhat responsible for the local music scene in their city, region or country. A more local approach to electronic music leads to the creation of new sounds and trends. Here's how M. Barnes describes it for DJ Broadcast:

Iconic residents 
 Alfredo at Amnesia (Ibiza)
 Carl Cox at Space (Ibiza)
 Craig Richards at Fabric (London)
 Danny Tenaglia in Tunnel (New York)
 David Mancuso at The Loft (New York)
 Frankie Knuckles in Warehouse (Chicago)
 Harri & Domenic at Sub Club (Glasgow)
 Larry Levan at Paradise Garage (New York)
 Ron Hardy at Music Box (Chicago)

References 

DJing
Occupations in music